Deltras Football Club is an Indonesian football club based in Sidoarjo, East Java, Indonesia. They play in Liga 2. The club's home stadium is the Gelora Delta Stadium.

History
Founded in 1989 by a businessman named H.M. Mislan as Gelora Dewata '89 with home base in Bali, they moved to Sidoarjo in 2001 and changed their name to Gelora Putra Delta after playing some matches in the early 2001–2002 season. Some time later, still in 2001, the club renamed as Deltras, an acronym to Delta Putra Sidoarjo.

In 2003, the ownership status of the club changed from HM Mislan to the Government of Sidoarjo Regency, making Deltras another official football club of Sidoarjo after Persida Sidoarjo. In 2011, after the club's financial problem during the 2010–2011 season, the Government of Sidoarjo Regency established PT Delta Raya Sidoarjo, a limited liability firm owning Deltras Sidoarjo to fully professionalize the club's management.

The establishment of the firm in 2011 brought a great deal of change to the club. In late 2011, the club's management decided to change the club's name from Deltras Sidoarjo, to Deltras F.C. The term "Putra" in Deltra Putra Sidoarjo which means "Son" was changed to "Raya" which means "Great" or "Large".

Players

Current squad

Coaching staff

Management

Honours

Cup
 Piala Galatama
 Winners: 1994

Season-by-season records

Past seasons 
(As Gelora Dewata)

(As Deltras Sidoarjo)

Key
 Tms. = Number of teams
 Pos. = Position in league

Performance in AFC competitions
 Asian Cup Winners' Cup: 1 appearances
1994–95: Second round

1 Gelora Dewata disqualified due to fielding two ineligible players

Sponsors
 KAHURIPAN NIRWANA (2011)

Kit supplier
 DTS (2022)
 Adidas (2011)
 Jook sport (present)

Asian club ranking

Supporters
Deltras supporters are referred to as Deltamania.

Affiliated clubs
  Tainan City

References

External links
 

 
Sidoarjo Regency
Football clubs in Indonesia
Football clubs in East Java
Association football clubs established in 1989
1989 establishments in Indonesia